In My Genes is a Kenyan 2009 documentary film directed, written, produced and edited by Lupita Nyong'o in her directing debut.

Synopsis 
How does one live as a pale person in a dominantly black society? What does one feel being one of the most visible persons and, probably, one of the most ignored? Agnes, an albino woman in Kenya, feels it daily. Ever since she was born, she has had to deal with the prejudices that surround albinos. In My Genes bears witness to the lives of eight people who suffer discrimination due to a simple genetic anomaly.

Awards 
 Festival de Cine Africano de México 2008

References

External links
 

2009 films
2009 documentary films
Kenyan documentary films
Works about genetics
Albinism in popular culture